Channel 101: NY, formerly known as Channel 102, is a monthly live screening of five-minute-long "TV shows" in New York City, created by Tony Carnevale, with the blessings of Dan Harmon and Rob Schrab. Harmon and Schrab created Channel 101, the Los Angeles-based film festival that inspired Channel 101: NY. 

Channel 101: NY launched on February 3, 2005 as Channel 102 at the Variety Underground showcase at the Parkside Lounge. For that debut screening, all pilots that were submitted which met the five-minute maximum length were accepted. Eleven were shown, and the top five became the first "prime time" shows of Channel 102.

Concept and history
The concept is identical to that of Channel 101, and follows its model of operations. Anyone can submit a pilot using a private link or DV tape. The content, genre, and style of the show are entirely open as long as the length of the show is under five minutes. From all the submissions, only a portion is screened for the live audience. 

Between three and seven new pilots join the previous months' prime time of five continuing shows. At the end of the screening, all audience members fill out "Executive Decision Ballots," checking off their five top shows. Only the shows with the highest five ratings will return next month with a new episode, all other shows are "cancelled."

The "Prime Time Panel" is made up of representatives from the shows with the highest audience vote totals from the previous month's screening. At the screening (which occurs roughly every month), the audience votes (or "renews") its top five favorite shows. The creators of those shows continue making new episodes each month until they fall from the top five, which means they have been "cancelled."

Screening locations
After leaving the Parkside Louge, Channel 102 held several screenings at the Upright Citizens Brigade Theatre (NYC) from March through September 2005. In November 2005, Channel 102 moved to the 192-seat Courthouse Theater at The Anthology Film Archives. Other past venues included Pianos Bar and Tribeca Cinemas. Channel 101: NY screened at the Upright Citizens Brigade Theatre at the UCBeast location at 153 E 3rd Street from 2012–2018, and most recently has screened regularly at the Spectacle Theater microcinema.

Changes to format
In November 2007, Kelly Kubik, Dan Harmon's former personal assistant and creative collaborator on many 101 shows, and Stephen Levinson moved to New York, Levinson replacing Will Hines as the "showrunner" of Channel 102. Levinson commenced several new initiatives including moving the screening from Tribeca Cinemas to Pianos' Bar, making entry free and rebranding Channel 102 as "Channel 101:NY" in order to draw the brands together.  Ed Mundy then took control, and helped move the show to UCB East, where screenings are still held monthly.

Notable personalities

 Tony Carnevale – Locked in A Closet, Purgatory
 Will Hines – The Fun Squad, Sexual Intercourse: American Style
 John Gemberling  – Gemberling
 Curtis Gwinn – Gemberling
 Austin Bragg – Jesus Christ Supercop, The Defenders of Stan
 Hunter Christy – Jesus Christ Supercop, The Defenders of Stan
 Paul Gale – Animal Pick Up Artist
 Kirk Damato – My Wife the Ghost, Cakey! The Cake From Outer Space
 Jess Lane – Teen Homicide, The Jon & Jess Variety Hour
 Abbi Jacobson – Broad City
 Ilana Glazer – Broad City

 Randall Park – Dr. Miracles
 Mitch Magee – Sexual Intercourse: American Style, Mister Glasses, Welcome To My Study
 Karen Lurie – American Cookbook
 Nick Poppy – American Cookbook
 Shek Baker – Host
 Chris Prine – Scissor Cop
 Edward Mundy – Nice Brothers
 Matt Koff – 9AM Meeting, Host
 Nick Bernardone – Army Husbands
 Chioke Nassor – Titsburg
 Dan Opsal – Acting Reel Master Database
Dan Markowitz – NWAR – (Engaged at Hamilton)
 Ellie Kemper – Sexual Intercourse: American Style, Mister Glasses
 Rachel Bloom – Army Husbands

Notable shows
The Fun Squad – The first #1 prime time show
NWAR – Current longest-running show with 24 episodes
NWAR – Longest consecutive streak at #1
Gemberling – The original episodes were re-aired on Fuse, and a new version premiered on Cartoon Network's Adult Swim block as Fat Guy Stuck in Internet
Sexual Intercourse: American Style – Longest-running show to never reach #1
Shutterbugs – Created by Aziz Ansari and Rob Huebel, later to form the MTV sketch comedy show Human Giant
I Love The '30s – Licensed to Comedy Central
Broad City – Cancelled after one episode, but made into a TV show on Comedy Central starring Abbi Jacobson and Ilana Glazer
Animals – Became a TV show on HBO which ran for three seasons

See also
Channel 101

References

External links 
 
92YTribeca: current screening venue
Featured in NYmag.
iTunes Podcast

American entertainment websites
Television websites
Channel 101